Unfinished Monkey Business is the debut solo album by Ian Brown released in February 1998 via Polydor Records.  The album was self-financed and produced by Brown, and was his first album release since the break-up of The Stone Roses in October 1996.  Ex-Roses members Mani, Nigel Ipinson, Aziz Ibrahim and Robbie Maddix helped pen and perform the instruments on many of the album's tracks.  "Ice Cold Cube", which premiered at The Stone Roses final concert, was first released on this album.

Background and recording

Much of Unfinished Monkey Business focuses on the acrimonious split between Brown and former Roses' guitarist John Squire.  Brown shares his unabashed opinion of his ex-bandmate on tracks including "Ice Cold Cube", "Can't See Me", "What Happened To Ya" and "Deep Pile Dreams", focusing in particular on Squire's supposed self-centredness, two-facedness and dependence on drugs, specifically cocaine.

The track "Intro Under The Paving Stones: The Beach" was inspired by a slogan from the French May 1968 protests, an event that also inspired the song "Bye Bye Badman" from The Stone Roses.  A popular protest slogan at the time, "Sous les pavés, la plage!" is translated into English as "Beneath the pavement, the beach!", and refers to the sand found under paving stones ripped up by rioters to use as projectiles aimed at the police.

The words 'I only ever wanted the one with the flag but all you ever wanted was a sixty dollar bag and a cheap limousine for your deep pile dreams on the highway' also appear in Babyshambles' second album, Shotter's Nation. As a result, Brown has songwriting credits on the track "French Dog Blues".

Recording began in Brown's home studio and was completed at Chiswick Reach Studios in London. Brown played most of the instruments himself.

On the album's title, Brown stated "The press used to refer to me as 'simian lead singer'. My arms have always been too long for my body. But I've been called 'monkey' all my life, so I thought I'd keep that theme."

Reception

Track listing
"Intro Under the Paving Stones: The Beach" (n/a) – 1:50
"My Star"  (Brown, Aziz Ibrahim) – 5:13
"Can't See Me"  (Brown, Gary Mounfield) – 4:54
"Ice Cold Cube"  (Brown, Ibrahim) – 6:27
"Sunshine" (Brown) – 3:58
"Lions" (Brown) – 6:52
"Corpses in Their Mouths"  (Brown, Ibrahim) – 4:09
"What Happened to Ya Part 1" (Brown, Nigel Ippinson, Robbie Maddix, Ibrahim) – 3:15
"What Happened to Ya Part 2" (Brown, Ippinson, Maddix, Ibrahim) – 5:38
"Nah Nah" (Ippinson) – 3:55
"Deep Pile Dreams" (Brown) – 3:39
"Unfinished Monkey Business" (Brown) – 3:11

Personnel
Musicians
Ian Brown - lead vocals, guitar (tracks 3, 8), bass guitar (tracks 3, 4), keyboards (track 4), drums (track 4), harmonica (track 7), acoustic guitar (track 8), all instruments (tracks 1, 5, 6, 11, 12)
Aziz Ibrahim - guitar (tracks 2, 4, 9, 10), bass guitar (tracks 2, 7), drums (tracks 2, 4, 7, 8), tabla (track 2), backing vocals (track 7), slide guitar (track 8)
Simon Moore - drums (tracks 2, 4, 9)
Mani - bass guitar (track 3)
Reni - drums (track 3)
Robbie Maddix - drums (except track 3)
Nigel Ippinson - bass guitar (track 10), keyboards (track 10)
Noel Walters - backing vocals (tracks 2, 7)
Abdul Ibrahim - chant (track 9)
Denise Johnson - backing vocals (track 6)
Production
Ian Brown - design, production, mixing (tracks 1, 2, 5 to 9, 11, 12)
Nigel Luby - additional engineering
Dave Hyatt - engineering
Nick Terry - engineering
Fabiola Quiroz - photography
Aziz Ibrahim - additional production

References

1998 debut albums
Ian Brown albums
Polydor Records albums